The stuffed cucumber is an ingredient found in various cuisines around the world. Some stuffed cucumber dishes, such as Korean oi sobaegi, incorporate preserved cucumbers, whereas others, such as American recipes, use fresh cucumbers. The ingredients used to actually stuff the cucumber vary widely from cuisine to cuisine.

Many different dishes incorporating stuffed cucumber exist. In Korean cuisine,  oi sobaegi is a kimchi made from stuffed cucumber filled with onions, shrimp, ginger, garlic and chili. In Nevşehir, Turkey, ripe cucumbers are dried in the sun, then stuffed with bulghur seasoned with dill, mint, tomato paste and onion.

American cookbooks from the early 20th century described many different fillings for stuffed cucumber, including French dressing, mayonnaise, tomatoes, walnuts, celery,  onions, and lobster. After being hollowed out with a specialized tool, the filling is piped into the cucumber.  Some versions and breaded and fried before being served whole, or sliced to serve as a garnish for another dish. Others are stewed or baked in gravy. At state fairs in the United States in the 2010s, stuffed cucumbers were marketed as a "healthier alternative" to deep fried or chocolate covered fair food.

See also
 List of stuffed dishes

References

State fairs
American vegetable dishes
Stuffed dishes
Mayonnaise
Korean vegetable dishes
Turkish vegetarian cuisine